Amherst Audubon Field is a baseball field located on the campus of the University at Buffalo in Amherst, New York, United States. The field was built as the home of the Buffalo Bulls baseball team, which competed in the National Collegiate Athletic Association (NCAA) at the Division I level as a member of the Mid-American Conference (MAC) until 2017. 

The Bulls played their home games at Dunn Tire Park in 2000. Construction of the field was completed in 2001 and it underwent major renovations in 2002 and 2003, which included an entirely new playing surface and drainage system.

In 2020, Ron Torgalski admitted to USA Today that, when he was serving as the Buffalo Bulls baseball coach and hosting visits from recruits, he hoped that they would not ask to see Audubon Field because of how dilapidated and unimpressive it was.

See also
 List of NCAA Division I baseball venues
 UB Stadium
 Alumni Arena

References

External links 
 Amherst Audubon Field on ubbulls.com

Buffalo Bulls baseball
College baseball venues in the United States
University at Buffalo
Sports venues in Erie County, New York
Baseball venues in New York (state)
2001 establishments in New York (state)
Sports venues completed in 2001